Frolík is a surname. Notable people with the surname include:

Josef Frolík (1928–1989), Czechoslovak spy 
Michael Frolík (born 1988), Czech ice hockey player
Zdeněk Frolík (1933–1989), Czech mathematician

See also
 Frolick

Czech-language surnames